Vicente Ferrer may refer to:

Vicente Ferrer Moncho (1920-2009), Spanish former jesuit missionary
 Vicente Ferrer Roselló (born 1959), deputy and former senator in the Spanish parliament
 Vincent Ferrer (1350-1419), saint
 places named after Saint Vincent Ferrer, including:
 Misión San Vicente Ferrer
 São Vicente Ferrer, Maranhão, municipality in Marnhão state, Brazil
 São Vicente Ferrer, Pernambuco, municipality in Pernambuco state, Brazil